was a village located in Sannohe District in central Aomori Prefecture, Japan.

Nangō Village was founded on April 1, 1889. On March 31, 1957 it merged with the neighboring villages of Shimamori and Nakazawa.

On March 31, 2005, Nangō was merged into the expanded city of Hachinohe, and thus it no longer exists as an independent municipality.

An inland village, Nangō had an agriculture-based economy. At the time of its merger, Nangō had an estimated population of 6,440 and a population density of 70.67 persons per km2. The total area was 91.13 km2.

Dissolved municipalities of Aomori Prefecture